The Indiana Tribune was a German-language daily newspaper published in Indiana, US.

General 
In August 1878, Louis D. Hild founded a new pro-Republican, German-language, four-page weekly newspaper, the Indiana Tribune. The circulation was originally 800 copies. In April 1882, the newspaper was purchased by the Tribune Company. The Tribune had a four-page daily circulation of 3,000 in 1882. On 7 March 1907, the publisher combined the two newspapers Indiana Tribune and Daily Telegraph into a single newspaper titled the Indianapolis Telegraph and Tribune. On 1 June 1918, the publishing house closed.

Other German-language newspapers in Indiana 
Pro-Republican
 Free Press of Indiana (1853-66).
 Indiana German Newspaper (1874-77)
Pro-Democratic
 Indiana Volksblatt (1848-75)
 Daily Telegraph (1865-1907)

References 

Newspapers published in Indiana
Defunct newspapers published in Indiana
Publications established in 1878
Publications disestablished in 1918
German-language mass media in the United States